This is a list of the heads of government of Zanzibar, an autonomous region of Tanzania. The office of Chief Minister (later changed to Prime Minister) was established in 1961 and abolished in 2010, having been previously abolished between 1964 and 1983.

Chief ministers of the Sultanate of Zanzibar
Status

Prime minister of the Sultanate of Zanzibar

Prime minister of the People's Republic of Zanzibar

Chief ministers of the Revolutionary Government of Zanzibar

See also

Tanzania
Politics of Tanzania
List of governors of Tanganyika
President of Tanzania
List of heads of state of Tanzania
Prime Minister of Tanzania
List of prime ministers of Tanzania
List of sultans of Zanzibar
President of Zanzibar
Vice President of Zanzibar
Lists of office-holders

External links
World Statesmen - Zanzibar

Zanzibar, List of Heads of Government of
Government of Zanzibar
Government ministers of Zanzibar
Zanzibar Presidents
Zanzibar
Heads of government
Tanzania history-related lists